Volleyball and beach volleyball at the 2019 African Games were held from 16 to 31 August 2019 in Salé, Morocco.

Indoor volleyball was held from 22 to 31 August and beach volleyball was held from 16 to 21 August.

The beach volleyball event served as a qualifier for the 2020 Summer Olympics in Tokyo, Japan.

Participating nations

Medal table

Indoor volleyball

Beach volleyball

Results

Men

Pool A

|}

|}

Pool B

|}

|}

Pool C

|}

|}

Pool D

|}

|}

13/16 places

Semifinals

|}

9/12 places

Semifinals

|}

References

External links 
 Beach volleyball
 Indoor volleyball

2019 African Games
African Games
2019 African Games
2019